Kokkinopilos is an Aromanian village and a community of the Elassona municipality. Before the 2011 local government reform it was a part of the municipality of Olympos. The 2011 census recorded 125 inhabitants in the village and 592 inhabitants in the community. The community of Kokkinopilos covers an area of 129.368 km2.

Administrative division
The community of Kokkinopilos consists of two settlements:
 Kalyvia
Kokkinopilos

Population
According to the 2011 census, the population of the settlement of Kokkinopilos was 125 people, a decrease of almost 29% compared with the population of the previous census of 2001.

History
Kokkinopilos was founded in the 12th century by Aromanian farmers. It was captured by the Ottomans in 1442 was administered as a chiflik. The settlement is recorded as village and as "Kokinopulo" in the Ottoman Tahrir Defter number 101 dating to 1521. After a failed revolt against the Turkish Ottomans during the Greek War of Independence, the village was captured and looted by Ottoman troops. On 21 October 1912 Kokkinopilos was taken by the Greek Army. During the Axis occupation of Greece the village was burned twice: in 1943 by the Italians and in 1944 by the Germans. The latter resulted to the scattering of the population of the village, in Katerini and Thessaloniki and to the establishment of Kalyvia as a permanent settlement.

See also
 List of settlements in the Larissa regional unit

References

Aromanian settlements in Greece
Populated places in Larissa (regional unit)